Parliamentary elections were held in the Nagorno-Karabakh Republic on 3 May 2015.

Background
Nagorno-Karabakh declared its independence from Azerbaijan in 1991. The First Nagorno-Karabakh War took place between 1988 and 1994 which resulted in Nagorno-Karabakh, with Armenian support, becoming de facto independent from Azerbaijan. However it has not been internationally recognised and Azerbaijan still claims the area as part of its state.

Conduct
More than 100 representatives from 30 countries observed the elections.

Results

Reactions
Azerbaijan, the European Union, the United States and Turkey all said that they did not recognise the elections.

References

Elections in the Republic of Artsakh
Nagorno
Nagorno
Parliamentary
Election and referendum articles with incomplete results